An invincible error is, in Catholic moral theology, a normally sinful action which is not considered sinful because it was committed through blameless ignorance that one's actions were harmful or otherwise prohibited.

In the stated philosophy, a sin occurs when a person knowingly commits an evil act, meaning that they must know both:
that they are committing the act
that the act is evil
If a person is ignorant of one of these two facts, then the type of ignorance becomes important. If the person is intentionally or willfully ignorant, this is known as vincible ignorance, and the act is still considered a sin. If, however, the person is unintentionally ignorant of one of these two key facts, then they are considered invincibly ignorant, and have committed an invincible error.

See also
Invincible ignorance (Catholic theology)
Fate of the unlearned
Future probation
Limbo
Universal opportunity
Vincible ignorance
Willful blindness

References

Christian philosophy